The International Scout and Guide Fellowship (ISGF) is a worldwide organization of adults in support of Scouting and Guiding.

The International Scout and Guide Fellowship is open to former members of the World Association of Girl Guides and Girl Scouts (WAGGGS) and the World Organization of the Scout Movement (WOSM), and to other adults who wish to support Scouting.

It was created in 1953 under the name of International Fellowship of Former Scouts and Guides (IFOFSAG).

ISGF is supported by WOSM and WAGGGS, and it has members in 75 countries presently. Furthermore, there are members of Central Branch (individual members or groups) in 32 countries.

In 2013, the 55,500 members celebrated the 60th anniversary of ISGF by carrying out projects to the benefit of communities in which they live and work or worldwide.

Organization
ISGF consists of national Member Organizations called NSGFs (National Scout and Guide Fellowships) and of the members of the Central Branch in countries where there is not yet a NSGF.

World Regions

Africa
Angola
Benin
Burkina Faso
Democratic Republic of the Congo

Gambia
Ghana
Ivory Coast (associate member)
Nigeria
Senegal
Uganda
Zambia

Arab
Algeria
Bahrain
Egypt
Jordan 
Kuwait
Lebanon
Libya
Morocco
Palestine
Qatar
Saudi Arabia
Tunisia
United Arab Emirates

Asia Pacific
Australia
Bangladesh
India
Indonesia
Malaysia
Maldives
Nepal
New Zealand
Pakistan
South Korea
Sri Lanka

Europe
Region Europe has 4 regional divisions:
Nordic Baltic Sub-region
Western Europe Sub-region
Central Europe Sub-region
Southern Sub-Region

Central Europe Sub-region
Austria
Czech Republic
Estonia
Germany
Latvia
Liechtenstein
Poland
Romania
Slovakia
Slovenia
Switzerland

Nordic Baltic Sub-region
Denmark
Finland
Iceland
Lithuania 
Norway
Sweden

Southern Sub-region
Cyprus
France
Greece
Italy 
Portugal
Spain
South (French speaking) Switzerland
Turkey

Western Europe Sub-region
Belgium
France
Ireland
Luxembourg
Netherlands
United Kingdom

Western Hemisphere
Argentina
Brazil
Chile
Curaçao
Guatemala
Haiti
Mexico
Panama
Peru
Suriname
Trinidad & Tobago
Venezuela

Central Branch
Groups and/or individuals in the following countries:
Aruba
Botswana
Burundi
Cambodia
Cameroon
Canada
Cape Verde
Colombia
Congo Brazzaville
Costa Rica
Cuba
Ecuador
El Salvador
Grenada
Hong Kong
Israel
Japan
Kenya
Malawi
Philippines
Rwanda
Singapore
South Africa
Sudan
Taiwan (ROC)
Tanzania
Thailand
Togo
Uruguay

United States of America
Zimbabwe

International Ambassadors Guild
This Guild, founded in 1997, is a foundation to support Scouting and Guiding worldwide.

See also

Scout Fellowship (UK) 
Baden-Powell Guild (Australia)

References

International Scouting organizations
Organisations based in Brussels
Organizations established in 1953